The Army Reserve Medical Command (AR-MEDCOM) vision is to be the United States Army Reserve premier Medical Command, supporting the United States' national military strategy. The Army Reserve Medical Command mission is to provide trained, equipped, ready, skill-rich Citizen-Soldiers, to meet medical requirements across full spectrum military operations. ARMEDCOM provides command and control for table of distribution and allowance (TDA) reserve medical units within the contiguous United States. Army Reserve Medical Command headquarter is located at the CW Bill Young Armed Forces Reserve Center in Pinellas Park, Florida.

Reserve Table of Organization and Equipment (TOE) medical units and formations are commanded by the 807th MDSC, which covers west of Ohio, and the 3rd MDSC covers units to the east of Ohio.

Army Reserve Medical Command is responsible for all table of distribution and allowance (TDA) reserve medical units within CONUS. In 1990 the Army Reserve maintained 24 Table of Distribution and Allowances (TDA) hospitals, designed to augment 'existing Army hospitals' in the Continental United States. At that time they included the 1125th (Devens); 1207th (Benning); 1208th U.S. Army Hospital (Fort Monmouth); 2289th Army Hospital (Fort Dix); 2290th at Walter Reed; 2291st at Fort Lee; 3270th at Fort Jackson; 3271st at Fort Stewart; 3273rd at Fort Campbell; 3274th at Fort Bragg; 3297th at Fort Gordon; 3343rd at Redstone Arsenal; 3344th at Fort Rucker; 3345th at Fort McClellan; 4005th at Fort Hood; 4010th, 5010th; 5501st; 5502nd; 5503rd; 6250th; 6251st; 6252nd at Fort Ord; and 6253rd Army Hospital at Fort Carson.

Formations and units 
 AMEDD Professional Management Command (APMC), at Forest Park, Georgia
 Medical Readiness and Training Command (MRTC) at Fort Sam Houston, Texas
 1st Medical Training Brigade, at Fort Gordon, Georgia
 7301st Medical Training Support Battalion, at Joint Base McGuire–Dix–Lakehurst, New Jersey
 7303rd Medical Training Support Battalion, at Fort Gordon, Georgia
 2nd Medical Training Brigade, in Salt Lake City, Utah
 7304th Medical Training Support Battalion, in San Antonio, Texas
 7305th Medical Training Support Battalion, in Sacramento, California
 3rd Medical Training Brigade, in San Antonio, Texas
 7302nd Medical Training Support Battalion, Madison, Wisconsin
 7306th Medical Exercise Support Battalion, in San Antonio, Texas
 7307th Medical Training Support Battalion, in San Antonio, Texas
 Central Medical Area Readiness Support Group (CE-MARSG), at Fort Sheridan, Illinois
 Northeast Medical Area Readiness Support Group (NE-MARSG), at Fort Wadsworth, New York
 Southeast Medical Area Readiness Support Group (SE-MARSG), in Nashville, Tennessee
 Western Medical Area Readiness Support Group (WE-MARSG), in Dublin, California

Lineage

Unit Insignia

Shoulder sleeve insignia (SSI)

Description

Symbolism
Maroon and white are the colors traditionally used by the Medical Corps. The cross and rod of Aesculapius, symbols of healing and medicine, symbolize the organization’s medical mission. The two stars represent the training of medical individuals and medical units. The black stars edged gold recall the Army logo and military preparedness.

Background
The shoulder sleeve insignia is approved effective 1 October 2005. (TIOH Drawing Number A-1-860)

Distinctive unit insignia (DUI)

Description

Symbolism
The Minute Man is adapted from the Army Reserve plaque and highlights the Army Reserve Medical Command being a direct reporting command to Headquarters, United States Army Reserve Command. The Minute Man has also traditionally been used to represent our citizen soldiers and recalls that heritage. Gold is emblematic of honor and excellence. Maroon is the Medical Corps' primary color. The cross and motto also highlight the Command's mission. The branch of oak represents strength and growth and the laurel, high achievement.

Background
The distinctive unit insignia is approved effective 1 October 2005.

Unit honors

References

External links

 Army Reserve Medical Command Home Page
 AR-MEDCOM YouTube Channel
 AR-MEDCOM MetaCafe Channel
 

Medical Commands of the United States Army
Military units and formations of the United States Army Reserve
Military units and formations established in 2005